The 1924 United States presidential election in Massachusetts took place on November 4, 1924, as part of the 1924 United States presidential election, which was held throughout all contemporary 48 states. Voters chose 18 representatives, or electors to the Electoral College, who voted for president and vice president.

Massachusetts was won in a landslide by incumbent Republican President Calvin Coolidge of Massachusetts, who was running against Democratic Ambassador John W. Davis of West Virginia and the Progressive Party’s Senator Robert M. La Follette of Wisconsin. Coolidge’s running mate was former Budget Director Charles G. Dawes of Illinois and Davis ran with Governor Charles W. Bryan of Nebraska, while La Follette ran with Senator Burton K. Wheeler of Montana.

Coolidge carried his home state overwhelmingly with 62.26% of the vote to Davis's 24.86%, a Republican victory margin of 37.41%. La Follette finished a strong third in the state with 12.50%.

Massachusetts had long been a typical Yankee Republican bastion in the wake of the Civil War, having voted Republican in every election since 1856, except in 1912, when former Republican President Theodore Roosevelt had run as a Progressive candidate against incumbent Republican President William Howard Taft, splitting the Republican vote and allowing Democrat Woodrow Wilson to win Massachusetts with a plurality of only 35.53% of the vote.

Calvin Coolidge, a traditional Yankee Republican born in neighboring Vermont, had served as a popular former Governor of Massachusetts, and thus easily was able to dominate the state on the presidential level. Even in the midst of the nationwide Republican landslide, Massachusetts weighed in as a solid 12% more Republican than the national average.

The 1920s were a fiercely Republican decade in American politics, and Massachusetts in that era was a fiercely Republican state in presidential elections. The economic boom and social good feelings of the Roaring Twenties under popular Republican leadership virtually guaranteed Calvin Coolidge an easy win in the state against the conservative Southern Democrat John Davis, who had little appeal in Northern states like Massachusetts. Coolidge won a strong majority statewide even with the Republican vote being split by the strong third party candidacy of Robert La Follette, a Republican Senator who ran as the Progressive Party candidate and peeled away the votes of many progressive Republicans.

Coolidge swept every county in the state of Massachusetts, and his 65.34% of the popular vote would prove to be his fifth strongest state in the 1924 election in terms of popular vote percentage after neighboring Vermont, Michigan, Maine and Pennsylvania. To date, this is the last time a Republican presidential candidate has carried every county in Massachusetts as well as the last election in which a Republican presidential candidate has won Suffolk County, home to the state's capital and largest city, Boston. No Republican has reached 60% of the vote since.  It is also the last time that the towns of Hadley and Hatfield and the cities of Boston, Cambridge, Chelsea, Chicopee, Fall River, Lawrence, and Revere voted Republican. From his time as governor, Coolidge remained relatively popular, for a Republican, among Irish Catholics and the other ethnic immigrant groups who populated Boston. Many of these voters would defect to the Democrats for Catholic Al Smith in 1928 and become reliable Democratic voters after that, making Boston a reliably Democratic city in every election that followed. 

This was the last time Massachusetts voted for a Republican candidate until Dwight D. Eisenhower won the state in 1952.

Results

Results by county

See also
 United States presidential elections in Massachusetts

References

Massachusetts
1924
1924 Massachusetts elections